Nelson Edgardo Colón Santiago (January 24, 1983) is a Puerto Rican professional basketball coach who is currently the head coach for Vaqueros de Bayamón of the Baloncesto Superior Nacional (BSN) and the Puerto Rican national team. He previously coached the Leones de Ponce, winning consecutive championships in 2014 and 2015. Colón was born in Ponce, Puerto Rico.

References

Living people
BSN coaches
Sportspeople from Ponce, Puerto Rico
1983 births